Albarracín is a Spanish town, in the province of Teruel, part of the autonomous community of Aragon. According to the 2007 census (INE), the municipality had a population of 1075 inhabitants. Albarracín is the capital of the mountainous Sierra de Albarracín Comarca

Albarracín is surrounded by stony hills and the town was declared a Monumento Nacional in 1961. The many red sandstone boulders and cliffs surrounding Albarracín make it a popular rock climbing location, particularly for boulderers.

History 
The town is named for the Hawwara Berber dynasty of the Banu Razin which was their capital from the early eleventh century until it was taken by the Almoravids in 1104.

From 1167 to 1300, Albarracín was an independent lordship known as the Sinyoría d'Albarrazín which was established after the partition of the Taifa of Albarracín under the control of Pedro Ruiz de Azagra. It was eventually conquered by Peter III of Aragon in 1284, and the ruling family, the House of Azagra was deposed. The last person to actually hold the title of Señor de Albarracín was Juan Núñez I de Lara, although his son, Juan Núñez II de Lara continued on as the pretender to the title until 1300 when the city and its lands were officially incorporated into the Kingdom of Aragon.

Geography 
The town is located in a meander of the Guadalaviar River. The Sierra de Albarracín mountain range rises to the South and West of the town.

Demographic growth

See also
 Taifa of Albarracin
 Sinyoría d'Albarrazín
 Diocese of Teruel and Albarracín.
 Diocese of Albarracín (1577–1852).

Gallery

References

External links 

Albarracín on Diputación de Teruel 
Discover Albarracín, a great Mudejar town in Aragón, Spain 

Albarracin
Climbing areas of Spain